Awadhesh Kumar Rai or  Awadesh Yadav (born c. 1952) is an Indian politician, affiliated to the Communist Party of India. Rai represented the Bachwara constituency in the Bihar Legislative Assembly 1990-2000. In the 2000 election, he lost the seat to Uttam Kumar Yadav of the Rashtriya Janata Dal by a narrow margin of 464 votes.

Rai finished in second place in the Bachwara seat in the two legislative elections of 2005. He regained the Bachwara seat in the 2010 election, being supported by the United Left Bloc alliance. He was the sole CPI legislator in Bihar during this tenure.

References

Communist Party of India politicians from Bihar
Living people
Year of birth missing (living people)